The Ministry of Social Development (MDS) is a ministry of the Argentine Government tasked with overseeing the country's public policies on issues such as social assistance, welfare and human development across the country. The ministry was created in 1955 as the Ministry of Social Assistance, and it was given its current name in 1999 during the presidency of Fernando de la Rúa. The current minister is Victoria Tolosa Paz, who has served since 2022 in the cabinet of President Alberto Fernández..

History 
During the presidency of Juan Domingo Perón a constitutional reform expanded the ministries of the federal government creating the Ministry of Health. In 1955 the military coup of Eduardo Lonardi abolished many of the changes made by Perón, including the Ministry of Health, and created the Ministry of Social Assistance. It was soon after renamed Ministry of Social Assistance and Public Health, and later in 1966 renamed Ministry of Social Welfare, while still overseeing public health issues. During the 1983 democratic government of Raul Alfonsin the ministry was renamed again as Ministry of Health and Social Action, and in 1999 president Fernando De la Rúa decided to split the two ministries again, giving each the same precedence in the Cabinet of Ministers. Thus the modern Ministry of Social Development was born, which was again briefly merged with the Ministry of Health during the presidency of Mauricio Macri regarding budget cuts in 2018. In 2019, newly appointed president Alberto Fernandez decided to split both ministries again on the first day in office, and thus the Ministry of Social Development became a ministry on itself again, and still is to this day.

Function and objectives 
Decree 141 signed by president Nestor Kirchner in 2003 modifies the Law of Ministries to clearly state the function and objectives of the Ministry of Social development, among which we can name:

 Execute actions towards modifying attitudes in the general population from a social perspective, and also planning and auditing any actions regarding promotion, protection, training and development of human groups with social needs, within the policies established by the federal government, and international treaties.
 To intervene in those cases of social emergency that require assistance from the government, in coordination with the Ministry of Health.
 Execute actions towards securing financing plans of social development.
 Formulate, normalize, coordinate, audit and evaluate food policies applied in federal, provincial and local levels.
 Execute actions of direct assistance to people in situation of social risk, both inside the country and abroad, participating in international help plans.
 Formulate policies destined to infancy, youth and family; design, execute, coordinate, audit and evaluate programs of promotion, protection, social integration and defense of the rights of minors, following the guidelines of the United Nations Convention on the Rights of the Child.
 Formulate policies regarding social promotion destined to the youth.
 Formulate policies towards strengthening social economy, and to design, execute, coordinate, audit and evaluate programs of microcredit destined to the socially vulnerable population.
 Assign and distribute subsidies to resolve unpredicted states of necessity, or those not covered by current programs, and those given to public or private institutions that develop activities benefiting the general population.

Central building 

The Ministry of Social Development has offices in over 50 locations across the country, but the central office is located in what is known as the Ministry of Public Works building, a rationalist style building located in the famous 9 de julio avenue in downtown Buenos Aires, between Moreno street and Belgrano avenue. The building originally housed the offices of the Ministry of Public Works since its inauguration in 1935, and President Carlos Menem relocated the ministry to a building near the Casa Rosada in 1991, allowing the then Ministry of Health and Social Action to have a new headquarters. After the split during the De la Rúa presidency, of the 22 floors of the building, the top 10 floors house the central offices of Social Development and the bottom 11 to the current Ministry of Health. The ground floor office space is split among the two ministries. Social Development also has offices in other 8 locations within the city of Buenos Aires, and offices in at least one city of every province of Argentina.

The building was built from 1932 to 1936, right around the time the government began plans to bulldoze complete blocks of buildings in a north–south corridor to create the 9 de julio avenue. By 1947, bulldozing and construction of the avenue reached the southern tip by Moreno street, but the building was spared from demolition, as it was the Ortiz Basualdo palace (headquarters of the French Embassy in Argentina) and the Palacio Álzaga Unzué in the northern end of the avenue. The avenue thus currently has a choke point between Belgrano avenue and Moreno Street, where the car lanes have to go around this building. It is the only building with a 9 de julio street address.

The building is notable for having two gigantic metal contour portraits of Eva Perón in the south and north facades, as a reminder of her dedication to the social development and welfare of the socially vulnerable population.

List of ministers

References

External links
 

Government ministries of Argentina
Social affairs ministries
Argentina
Argentina
1955 establishments in Argentina
1999 establishments in Argentina
Presidency of Fernando de la Rúa